The Critics' Choice Movie Award for Best Young Performer (Actor/Actress) is one of the awards given to people working in the film industry by the Critics Choice Association at the annual Critics' Choice Movie Awards.

Winners and nominees

1990s
Best Child Performance (1996-2003)

2000s

Best Young Actor (2004-2007)

Best Young Actress (2004-2007)

Best Young Performer (2008-present)

2010s

2020s

References

External links
 Official website

Y
Critics